Juan Alejandro Fernández Sánchez Navarro (born 3 January 1977) is a Mexican politician affiliated with the National Action Party. He serves as Senator of the LXII Legislature of the Mexican Congress for Baja California Sur.

References

Politicians from Mexico City
1977 births
Living people
21st-century Mexican politicians
Instituto Tecnológico Autónomo de México alumni
University of San Diego alumni
Members of the Senate of the Republic (Mexico) for Baja California Sur